Government Medical College, Surat is a full-fledged Government Medical college. It was established in the year 1964.  The college imparts the degree Bachelor of Medicine and Surgery (MBBS). Nursing and para-medical courses are also offered. The college is affiliated to Veer Narmad South Gujarat University and is recognised by Medical Council of India. The hospital associated with the college is one of the largest hospitals in the Surat. The selection to the college is done on the basis of merit through National Eligibility and Entrance Test. Yearly undergraduate student intake is 250.

Seats

UG Seats distribution

PG Seats distribution

References

External links 
 https://www.gmcsurat.edu.in/

1964 establishments in Gujarat
Educational institutions established in 1964
Medical colleges in Gujarat